Belmont High School may refer to

United States:
 Belmont High School (Los Angeles, California)
 Belmont High School (Massachusetts)
 Belmont High School (New Hampshire)
 Belmont High School (Ohio)
 Belmont High School (Wisconsin)
 Belmont Preparatory High School, The Bronx, New York City
 South Point High School (North Carolina) (formerly Belmont High School), Belmont, North Carolina

Australia:
 Belmont High School (Victoria)
 Belmont City College, Belmont, Western Australia (formerly Belmont Senior High School)

Canada:
 Belmont Secondary School (formerly Belmont High School), Langford, British Columbia

See also
 Belmont School (disambiguation)